Bloodstained Endurance is the sixth studio album by the Norwegian black/gothic metal band Trail of Tears. It was the first full-length album recorded after Kjetil Nordhus, Runar Hansen, Kjell Rune Hagen and Jonathan Perez left the band in November 2006, forcing frontman Ronny Thorsen to assemble a new band. It is also the first album to feature soprano Cathrine Paulsen since A New Dimension of Might in 2002. The cover, by Travis Smith, uses the band logo from that album.

On April 2, 2009, the song "The Feverish Alliance" was posted on the band's official Myspace profile. Later, the song "Once Kissed by the Serpent (Twice Bitten by Truth)" was also added.

Track listing
 "The Feverish Alliance" – 4:02
 "Once Kissed by the Serpent (Twice Bitten by Truth)" – 3:22
 "Bloodstained Endurance" – 3:36
 "Triumphant Gleam" – 3:41
 "In the Valley of Ashes" – 3:55
 "A Storm at Will" – 4:00
 "Take Aim. Reclaim. Prevail" – 3:12
 "The Desperation Corridors" – 4:13
 "Farewell to Sanity" – 4:32
 "Dead End Gaze" – 3:58
 "Faith Comes Knocking" – 4:32
 "Onward March the Merciless" (Bonus track on digipak) – 3:08

Personnel

Trail of Tears
 Ronny Thorsen – vocals
 Cathrine Paulsen − soprano
 Bjørn Erik Næss − guitar
 Pål Olsen − guitar
 Endre Moe − bass guitar
 Cato Jensen − drums

Additional musicians
Audun Grønnestadt - additional orchestration, synths and programming

Production
Terje Refsnes - producer, engineer, mixing
Mika Jussila - mastering at Finnvox Studios, Finland, January 2009
Travis Smith - cover art

Release dates
Source:

References

2009 albums
Trail of Tears (band) albums
Napalm Records albums
Albums with cover art by Travis Smith (artist)